Kate Brasher (born 2 August 1962) is a retired tennis player from the UK who competed on the WTA Tour.

Brasher is the daughter of Shirley Bloomer, who won the ladies singles title at the 1957 French Open, and Olympic athlete Chris Brasher. She was a British Junior champion and played for Britain in the Junior Wightman Cup. She retired from the full-time game in order to attend London University.

References

External links
 
 

1962 births
English female tennis players
Place of birth missing (living people)
Living people
British female tennis players